Waldo Sandoval is a middle-distance runner from Santiago, Chile. He placed third in the 1956 South American Championships in Athletics for the 1500 metres run. Waldo is the younger brother of runner Ramon Sandoval. He currently resides in Miami, FL.

References

1933 births
Living people
Chilean male middle-distance runners
Athletes (track and field) at the 1955 Pan American Games
Pan American Games competitors for Chile
Sportspeople from Santiago